Domingo Serafín Federico (4 June 1916, in Buenos Aires – 16 April 2000) was an Argentine bandoneon player, songwriter and actor.

References

1916 births
2000 deaths
Argentine songwriters
Male songwriters
Musicians from Buenos Aires
Male actors from Buenos Aires
Bandoneonists
20th-century male musicians